The 2023 Saint-Henri–Sainte-Anne provincial by-election was held on March 13, 2023. Québec solidaire's Guillaume Cliche-Rivard won the election.

Background

Constituency 
The Saint-Henri–Sainte-Anne constituency is based on the Le Sud-Ouest borough of Montreal.

Trigger 
Following the 2022 Quebec general election, Dominique Anglade announced her resignation as leader of the Quebec Liberal Party on November 7, 2022. On December 1, 2022, she resigned as MNA for Saint-Henri–Sainte-Anne.

Candidates 

 Christopher Baenninger, Quebec Liberal Party
Beverly Bernardo, Independent
 Jean-Charles Cléroux, Direct Democracy
 Guillaume Cliche-Rivard, Québec Solidaire
 Ian Denman, Canadian Party of Quebec
 Jean-Pierre Duford, Green Party of Quebec
 Andréanne Fiola, Parti Québécois
 Lucien Koty, Conservative Party of Quebec
 Shawn Lalande McLean, Parti accès propriété et équité (English: Access to property and equity)
 Victor Pelletier, Coalition Avenir Québec
 Jean-François Racine, Climat Quebec

Result

Previous result

See also 

 2022 Quebec general election
 Dominique Anglade
 List of Quebec by-elections
 Saint-Henri–Sainte-Anne

References 

Politics of Montreal
Le Sud-Ouest
Provincial by-elections in Quebec
2023 elections in Canada
2023 in Quebec
March 2023 events in Canada